Chen Li Ping is a paralympic athlete from China competing mainly in category F54/55 throwing events.

Chen Li Ping competed in all three throwing events at the 2004 Summer Paralympics and although she was unable to medal in the shot she did win bronze medals in both the discus and javelin.

References

External links
 

Year of birth missing (living people)
Living people
Chinese female shot putters
Chinese female discus throwers
Chinese female javelin throwers
Paralympic athletes of China
Paralympic bronze medalists for China
Paralympic medalists in athletics (track and field)
Athletes (track and field) at the 2004 Summer Paralympics
Medalists at the 2004 Summer Paralympics
21st-century Chinese women